Oseyo is a supermarket chain specializing in Korean foods, as well as other Asian products.

Overview
The company currently has ten branches in the United Kingdom, eight of which are located in London.

The first store was opened on Tottenham Court Road, London in 2015.

While nine of the ten shops are mainly focused on selling grocery items, London Waterloo station branch used to also cater for hot foods, and originally offering a number of seats for eating in Korean meals, before this was discontinued in 2022.

The company is a partner of H Mart group, which launched its first store in Europe in London New Malden in 2011.

Although specializing in Korean food, a variety of other Asian products, from Japan, China, Thailand, Vietnam, Philippines, Malaysia, Taiwan etc., and a number of stationery and household products are part of its assortment.

When translated from Korean into English, the name "Oseyo" means "Welcome, please come in".

Branches
London
 Tottenham Court Road
 Camden Town
 Waterloo
 Angel
 Soho
 Hammersmith
 Battersea Power Station
 Kingston
Outside London
 Oxford Road, Manchester
 Cambridge

See also
Asian supermarket
H Mart
Wing Yip

References

Supermarkets of the United Kingdom
Shops in London
Retail companies based in London
British companies established in 2015
Retail companies established in 2015